Capaldi (variant Capaldo) is an Italian surname. 
The name is of Southern Italian origin. It may be a derivation from caput "head".
The Capaldo family originates in Bisaccia, Irpinia, Campania. 
Capaldi may be a patronymic or pluralisation derived from Capaldo.

Notable people with the surname include:
Capaldi
 Francesca Capaldi (born 2004), American actress
 Jim Capaldi (1944–2005), English musician
 John Capaldi (born 1959), Scottish former footballer
 Lewis Capaldi (born 1996), Scottish singer
 Peter Capaldi (born 1958), Scottish actor, writer and director
 Tony Capaldi (born 1981), Norwegian-Northern Irish footballer
Capaldo
 (1901–1978), Neapolitan singer
 (1874–1919), Neapolitan poet
 (1855–1947), Italian politician
Nicolás Capaldo (b. 1997), Argentine footballer
 (b. 1939), Italian politician
 (1845–1925), Italian politician

Italian-language surnames